Richard Geoffrey Gerard  (4 October 1904 – 26 September 1997) was a New Zealand politician of the National Party, and a cabinet minister.

Biography

Gerard was born in Christchurch in 1904. He received his education at Christ's College and then farmed at Mount Hutt.

He represented the Canterbury electorates of Mid-Canterbury from 1943 to 1946, and then the Ashburton electorate from 1946 to 1966 when he retired. He was Minister of Marine under Holland and Holyoake (1957, 1961–1963), Minister of Social Security (1957) under Holland and Holyoake, Minister of Lands under Holyoake (1957, 1960–1966), and Minister of Forests under Holyoake (1957, 1960–1966).

He was appointed a Companion of the Order of St Michael and St George for public services in the 1981 New Year Honours.

Notes

References

|-

|-

1904 births
1997 deaths
New Zealand National Party MPs
Members of the Cabinet of New Zealand
People educated at Christ's College, Christchurch
Members of the New Zealand House of Representatives
New Zealand MPs for South Island electorates
New Zealand Companions of the Order of St Michael and St George
People from Ashburton, New Zealand
20th-century New Zealand politicians